Huskey is an unincorporated community in Bollinger County, in the U.S. state of Missouri.

History
A post office called Huskey was established in 1887, and remained in operation until 1907. The community has the name of Thomas Huskey, an early settler.

References

Unincorporated communities in Bollinger County, Missouri
Unincorporated communities in Missouri